Natacha Lagouge (born 12 March 2000) is a French ice dancer. With her skating partner, Arnaud Caffa, she is the 2022 CS Ice Challenge silver medalist, 2022 International Challenge Cup champion, and 2023 World University Games bronze medalist.

With her former partner, Corentin Rahier, she is the 2017 JGP Austria bronze medalist and 2017 French national junior champion. They finished within the top eight at the 2018 World Junior Championships.

Personal life 
Lagouge was born on 12 March 2000 in Strasbourg, France. She holds French and Russian citizenship. Her mother is from Russia.

Career

Early years 
Lagouge began learning to skate in 2003. She started her competitive career in ladies' singles. She appeared on the advanced novice level in 2011 and moved up to the junior level by the 2014–2015 season. During her singles career, she spent some time training in Russia.

2015–16 season 
In 2015, Lagouge began considering switching to ice dancing. Her family contacted Muriel Zazoui, who suggested Corentin Rahier as a potential partner. After a successful tryout, the skaters decided to train together in Lyon. They placed 7th at the French Junior Championships in February 2016.

2016–17 season 
Lagouge/Rahier received two ISU Junior Grand Prix assignments; they placed 6th in Saint-Gervais-les-Bains, France, and 4th in Ljubljana, Slovenia. They were awarded the junior silver medal at the NRW Trophy and gold at the French Junior Championships. They placed 8th in the short dance, 11th in the free dance, and 11th overall at the 2017 World Junior Championships in Taipei, Taiwan.

2017–18 season 
In September 2017, Lagouge/Rahier won the bronze medal at the ISU Junior Grand Prix in Austria. They withdrew from JGP Croatia; Lagouge fractured her hand during a practice before the free dance and returned to Lyon for an operation.

2018–19 season 
Rahier retired from the sport in November 2018, leaving Lagouge without a partner. Arnaud Caffa soon contacted her. After trying out together in Lyon in late November and again in Paris in December 2018, he moved to Lyon at the end of January 2019 to begin their partnership.

2019–20 season 
Lagouge/Caffa made their competitive debut in September 2019, placing tenth at the 2019 CS Ondrej Nepela Memorial in Slovakia. In November, they won bronze at the Open d'Andorra and placed sixth at the Bosphorus Cup in Turkey. They were sixth at the French Championships.

2020–21 season 
Many events were cancelled in the 2020–21 season due to the COVID-19 pandemic. Lagouge/Caffa competed at only one international event, the 2020 CS Nebelhorn Trophy, where they placed fourth. They were coached by Olivier Schoenfelder, Muriel Zazoui, Marien de la Asuncion, Neil Brown, and Emi Hirai in Lyon, France.

2021–22 season 
Lagouge/Caffa decided to train under Maurizio Margaglio and Neil Brown in Helsinki, Finland.

In November, they took silver at the 2021 NRW Trophy in Germany and finished tenth at the 2021 CS Warsaw Cup in Poland. They placed fifth at the French Championships in December. In February, they won gold at the International Challenge Cup in the Netherlands.

2022–23 season 
Lagouge/Caffa won silver at the Britannia Cup in August, bronze at the Trophée Métropole Nice Côte d'Azur in October, and silver at the 2022 CS Ice Challenge in November. They will make their Grand Prix debut at the 2022 Grand Prix of Espoo in Finland.

Programs

With Caffa

With Rahier

Competitive highlights 
GP: Grand Prix; CS: Challenger Series; JGP: Junior Grand Prix

Ice dancing with Caffa

Ice dancing with Rahier

Ladies' singles

References

External links 
 
 

2000 births
French female ice dancers
Living people
Sportspeople from Strasbourg
French people of Russian descent
21st-century French women
Competitors at the 2023 Winter World University Games
Medalists at the 2023 Winter World University Games
Universiade medalists in figure skating
Universiade bronze medalists for France